Kiwi Alejandro Danao Camara (born June 16, 1984), also known as K.A.D. Camara, is a Filipino American attorney and businessman. Camara is known for being the CEO of DISCO. He also represented defendant Jammie Thomas-Rasset in the first file-sharing copyright infringement lawsuit in the U.S. brought by major record labels to be tried by a jury.

Originally from Manila, Camara's family relocated to the U.S. when he was a newborn, initially settling in Cleveland and later Honolulu. Camara attended Punahou School and Hawaii Pacific University, where he graduated at age 16.

Early life and education
Kiwi Alejandro Danao Camara was born in Manila, Philippines, to physicians Enrico Camara and Teresa Danao. He is a grandchild of the first summa cum laude graduate of the University of the Philippines College of Medicine, cardiologist Augusto Camara of Iba, Zambales. At age one, his family moved to Cleveland, where he later attended the Jewish school Ratner Academy. In 1990, his family relocated to Honolulu, and Camara completed his primary education at the Punahou School. He wrote a medical paper on alternative treatments for rheumatoid arthritis at age 11, which was published in the Hawai'i Journal of Medicine.

At 16, having skipped high school, Camara earned a Bachelor of Science degree in computer science summa cum laude from Hawaii Pacific University (HPU). He completed the program in two years and was recognized by the university for outstanding academic performance. During his time at HPU, he was elected to student government and served as the body's sponsor for the school's first Spring Formal. He was also president of the computer club and earned a silver medal evaluation in ballroom dance.

In 2001, Camara enrolled in Harvard Law School at the age of 17. There he received a John M. Olin fellowship in law and economics. He held the fellowship until September 2004, at which time he took a position as a law clerk for Judge Harris Hartz of the U.S. Court of Appeals for the Tenth Circuit. When he earned his Juris Doctor in 2004 at age 19, Camara became the youngest graduate of Harvard Law School. He played golf, racquetball, soccer, and tennis, and continued to participate in ballroom dance competitions, earning multiple awards for the Harvard-Radcliffe Ballroom Dancing Team.

During his first year at Harvard, Camara's use of an abbreviated racial slur in online course outlines prompted a fellow student to file a complaint and send copies to the Black Law Students' Association. The outlines were removed and Camara apologized. During a Yale Law Journal symposium in 2006, a group of Yale Law students and the school's dean protested Camara's panel participation by walking out to attend the alternative forum "Disempowered Voices in Legal Academia". He said he was "not surprised by or disapproving" of the demonstration, and apologized for any trouble caused by his presence. In 2009, Camara said he was denied jobs because of the incident.

After graduating from Harvard, Camara held a separate John M. Olin fellowship for 2006–2007 and was a visiting scholar at the Northwestern University School of Law. He was previously a John M. Olin fellow at Stanford Law School and briefly a Ph.D. student in economics at Stanford University.

Career
Prior to enrolling at Harvard Law School, Camara completed legal research and worked as an information systems specialist for Cades Schutte Fleming and Wright.

In 2007, he relocated to Houston, where he co-founded the law firm Camara & Sibley with business partner Joe Sibley in 2009. The duo became friends after meeting on their first day attending Harvard, and represented defendant Jammie Thomas-Rasset in the first file-sharing copyright infringement lawsuit in the U.S. brought by major record labels to be tried by a jury. The firm also represented Psystar Corporation in the copyright infringement case Apple v. Psystar (2009).

Camara founded the legal technology company DISCO in Houston in 2013, and relocated the company's headquarters to Austin, Texas, in 2018. He continues to serve as chief executive officer, as of 2021.

Personal life and recognition
The Philippines awarded Camara its Jose Rizal Certificate of Achievement while he was in college and later, in 2005, recognized him with a Presidential Commendation.

Publications

See also
 List of Harvard Law School alumni
 List of Punahou School alumni

References

External links 
 
  The People Vs. Harvard Law: How America's Oldest Law School Turned Its Back on Free Speech

1984 births
Living people
American chief executives
American jurists of Filipino descent
Harvard Law School alumni
Hawaii Pacific University alumni
People from Cleveland
People from Honolulu
People from Houston
People from Manila
John M. Olin Foundation